Albin Skoda (1909–1961) was an Austrian stage and film actor. He played the lead role of Adolf Hitler in the 1955 film The Last Ten Days by Georg Wilhelm Pabst. The same year he also appeared as the composer Antonio Salieri in Karl Hartl's Mozart.

The nephew of the actor Carl Skoda, he made his stage debut in 1918 as a child actor before attending the University of Music and Performing Arts Vienna.

Selected filmography
 Love, Death and the Devil (1934)
 The Queen of the Landstrasse (1948)
 Archduke Johann's Great Love (1950)
 Spring on Ice (1951)
 Goetz von Berlichingen (1955)
 The Last Ten Days (1955)
 Mozart (1955)
 William Tell (1956)

References

Bibliography
 Silberman, Marc. German Cinema: Texts in Context. Wayne State University Press, 1995.

External links

1909 births
1961 deaths
Burials at the Vienna Central Cemetery
Austrian male film actors
Austrian male stage actors
Actors from Vienna